Manik Varma (16 May 1926 – 10 November 1996) was an Indian classical singer from the Kirana and Agra gharanas (singing styles).

Career

Besides the pure classical khyal, she also sang semi-classical and light music like thumri, Marathi Natya Sangeet, Bhavgeet and Bhakti geet (devotional music). She was a disciple of Hirabai Barodekar and Sureshbabu Mane, daughter and son of Abdul Karim Khan, the founder of the Kirana gharana.She also took her rigorous training in Thumri Gayaki from Pandit Bholanath Bhatt of ‘Bhatt Parampara’ in Prayag, Allahabad.
She took further training from Azmat Hussain Khan "Dilrang" and Jagannathbua Purohit "Gunidas" of Agra gharana.

In April 1955, her songs became part of the Geet Ramayan, a presentation of songs on the Hindu god Rama, a weekly year-long programme by All India Radio (AIR), Pune, along with artists like Lata Mangeshkar, Yogini Joglekar, Usha Atre, Babanrao Navdikar and Sudhir Phadke.

She trained students including Asha Khadilkar and Shaila Datar.

Personal life
Her maiden name was Manik Dadarkar (Devanagari: माणिक दादरकर). Her daughters include Rani Varma, also a singer , Aruna Jayprakash, Bharati Achrekar, an actor, and Vandana Gupte, a Marathi stage, film and television actor.

Awards
She received the prestigious Padma Shri award from the government of India in 1974, followed by the Sangeet Natak Akademi Award given by the Sangeet Natak Akademi, India's National Academy for Music, Dance and Drama in 1986.

Legacy
In her memory Manik Varma Pratishthan was established in Mumbai, which also presents Manik Ratna Award and scholarships. It also organises function on the birth and death anniversary of Manik Verma. On her eighth death anniversary, on 12 November 2004, a musical programme Baharla Parijaat Daari was presented by Devgandharva Bakhlebua Trust at Tilak Smarak Mandir in Pune.<ref
name="inex"></ref>

References

External links
 
 List of Manik Varma songs
 http://www.youtube.com/watch?v=nmKyQzug2FE

Women Hindustani musicians
1926 births
1996 deaths
Musicians from Mumbai
Marathi-language singers
Indian women classical singers
Marathi music
Performers of Hindu music
Recipients of the Padma Shri in arts
Recipients of the Sangeet Natak Akademi Award
Thumri
Kirana gharana
20th-century Indian singers
Hindustani singers
20th-century Indian women singers
Women musicians from Maharashtra
20th-century Khyal singers